The 2009–10 Liga Nacional de Fútbol de Guatemala season is the 11th season in which the Apertura and Clausura season is used.

Format
The format for both championships are identical. Each championship will have two stages: a first stage and a playoff stage. The first stage of each championship is a double round-robin format. The teams that finishes 1 and 2 in the standings will advance to the payoffs semifinals, while the teams that finish 3–6 will enter in the quarterfinals. The winner of each quarterfinals will advance to the semifinals. The winners of the semifinals will advance to the finals, which will determine the tournament champion.

Teams

Torneo Apertura
The Torneo Apertura is the first championship of the season. It began on August 1, 2009, and ended on December 20, 2009.

Top scorers

Playoffs

Torneo Clausura
The Torneo Clausura is the second championship of the season. It began on January 15, 2010, and ended on May 15, 2010.

Results

Playoffs

Aggregate table

External links
 Guatefutbol 
 League stats RSSSF

Liga Nacional de Fútbol de Guatemala seasons
1
Guatemala